Crowdfixing is a specific way of crowdsourcing, in which people gather together to fix public spaces of the local community. The main aim is to fight against deterioration of public places. Crowdfixing actions include (but are not limited to) cleaning flashmobs, mowing, repairing structures, and removing unsafe elements.

History

Placemaking 
Placemaking, a concept originated in the 1960s that focused on planning, management and design of public places, was the philosophical background to the crowdfixing movement. According to placemaking, in the modern times all the resources needed to create community-friendly, enjoyable public spaces and keep them in good conditions are available, but decision-making processes exclude citizens' preferences.

Crowdfixing 
Crowdfixing promotes the idea of public spaces as belonging to the local community, in opposition to the concept of areas merely administrated and owned by the State.

Crowdfixing also tries to create better conditions for people to interact by providing them with online tools and mechanisms that allow them to set the different stages required to fix public spaces by improving the communication processes.

See also 
 Crowdsourcing
 Placemaking
 City repair project

Crowdsourcing
Web 2.0 neologisms